Annis Paul Stukus (October 25, 1914 – May 20, 2006) was a Canadian football player, coach and general manager, and ice hockey general manager.

Stukus was born in Toronto. He played for the Toronto Argonauts from 1935 to 1941, leading the team to Grey Cup victories in 1937 and 1938 (playing 45 regular season and 14 playoff games). He then played for the Oakwood Indians (1942), Balmy Beach (1943), HMCS York Bulldogs (1944) and the Toronto Indians (1945, 1946), all Toronto-based teams.

Stukus was a consultant to the Toronto Huskies basketball team in its one season of operations in 1946–47.

In 1949, he helped organize the Edmonton Eskimos' reentry into the Western Interprovincial Football Union and served as their head coach for three seasons. In 1953, he turned his services to the expansion BC Lions, serving as head coach and general manager. While the Lions would begin play the next year, he also coached one exhibition year for the Lions' amateur predecessor, the Vancouver Cubs.

In 1967, he was general manager of the Vancouver Canucks of the minor pro Western Hockey League. In 1971, Stukus became general manager of the Winnipeg Jets of the World Hockey Association and signed Bobby Hull to 10-year contract, with an unprecedented $1 million signing bonus. In 1974, he worked in the front office of the Vancouver Whitecaps soccer team.

The CFL's annual award for coach of the year is named in his honour.  He was elected into the Canadian Football Hall of Fame and the Canadian Sports Hall of Fame.

Annis was one of the famed Stukus brothers. Both Bill Stukus and Frank Stukus were Grey Cup champions. Indeed, while with the Argonauts all three played in the backfield at the same time, and won the Grey Cup together in 1938.

He died at his home in Canmore, Alberta, at age 91.

References

1914 births
2006 deaths
Canadian Football Hall of Fame inductees
Canadian football quarterbacks
Canadian people of Lithuanian descent
Edmonton Elks coaches
Edmonton Elks players
Ontario Rugby Football Union players
Players of Canadian football from Ontario
Canadian football people from Toronto
Toronto Argonauts players
Toronto Balmy Beach Beachers players
Winnipeg Jets (1972–1996) executives